Averills Island is a small forested island within the marshland of the Wenham Swamp, in the Ipswich River Wildlife Sanctuary in  Topsfield, Massachusetts. There is an unpaved road that connects the island with the mainland, from Bradstreet Hill to the Steward School on Perkins Row.

Islands of Essex County, Massachusetts
Topsfield, Massachusetts